Robert Edward Adamson (March 31, 1871  – September 19, 1935) was an American journalist and public official.

Biography
Adamson was born on March 31, 1871 in Clayton County, Georgia to Augustus Pitt Adamson and Martilla Ellen Cook.

He began writing articles for the Macon, Georgia newspaper while still in his teens.  At age 20, he became city editor of the Atlanta Constitution.  He later moved to New York City and worked as a reporter for The New York Sun, the New York World, and the Brooklyn Eagle.

He married Ethel McClintock May on December 10, 1902 at Trinity Chapel in Manhattan.

In 1910, Adamson became secretary to New York Mayor William Jay Gaynor, and gained fame by helping thwart an assassination attempt on Gaynor.  When Gaynor died in September 1910, Adamson continued as secretary to the new mayor, Ardolph Loges Kline. In 1914, he was campaign manager for John Purroy Mitchel.

In 1914 Mitchel appointed Adamson as the 9th Fire Commissioner of the City of New York. Adamson served in that position until the end of the Mitchel Administration on December 31, 1917. During his tenure he worked to have the entire department motorized. He also proposed a modern fire alarm system for the city.

Adamson unsuccessfully ran for the New York Board of Aldermen in 1917.  He then left politics to work in banking and public relations.

He died of a heart attack in Manhattan, New York City on September 19, 1935.

References

1871 births
1935 deaths
Commissioners of the New York City Fire Department
Editors of Georgia (U.S. state) newspapers